My Absolute Boyfriend is a 2019 South Korean television drama series based on the manga Absolute Boyfriend by Yuu Watase and starring Yeo Jin-goo, Bang Min-ah, Hong Jong-hyun, Hong Seo-young and Choi Sung-won. It aired on SBS TV on Wednesdays and Thursdays at 22:00 KST from May 15 to July 11, 2019. It is the third television drama based on the manga, following previous adaptations in Japan and Taiwan.

It is titled just Absolute Boyfriend on Viki in English-speaking countries, but the official English title in South Korea and on Netflix in Asia is My Absolute Boyfriend.

Synopsis
Um Da-da (Bang Min-ah) is a special effects makeup artist. She is secretly dating the popular actor Ma Wang-joon (Hong Jong-hyun), who is on the rise. As Wang-joon gets busy because of work and tired of their relationship, their seven-year-long relationship ends. And that is when Zero Nine (Yeong-gu) (Yeo Jin-goo), a humanoid robot who is programmed to be in love with his one and only girlfriend, appears in her life. An accidental kiss activates Yeong-gu and he takes Da-da as his girlfriend. As Da-da and Yeong-gu get closer and fall for each other, a mystery man tries to harm Da-da by threatening her to break up with Wang-joon, who secretly wants her back. Meanwhile, Diana (Hong Seo-young), the original owner of Zero Nine, comes after them to take Yeong-gu back. In the end, My Absolute Boyfriend is about the love with a robot who is humane and unstinting. Throughout the series, Yeong-gu shows what true love is as he learns about love and becomes the absolute boyfriend.

Cast

Main
 Yeo Jin-goo as Zero Nine (Young-gu) 
 An android programmed to become the perfect boyfriend. He takes Da-da as his girlfriend and gives his selfless love and dedication to her.
 Bang Min-ah as Um Da-da 
 A special effects makeup artist at Real, which she inherited from her late father. A recent break-up with her boyfriend Wang-joon left her insecure about love. Upon activating Young-gu, she slowly begins to learn more about true love from Young-gu.
 Hong Jong-hyun as Ma Wang-joon and Zero Ten
 A top actor whom in spite of his immense popularity, always seems to lose his cool around his girlfriend. He becomes jealous when Young-gu appears in his life and he tries to win back Da-da. As Zero Ten, Hong Jong-hyun plays a newer, more advanced android, also programmed to become the perfect boyfriend. Taking Diana as his girlfriend, he becomes the real Wang-joon's impersonator and tries to replace Young-gu as Da-da's absolute boyfriend.
 Hong Seo-young as Diana
 The original owner of Zero Nine, she is a young heiress who requested an android robot to be made due to her loneliness. She lost her right hand to a fire when she was a teenager and this led her to resent humans.
 Choi Sung-won as Nam Bo-won
 A Kronos Heaven employee who is Young-gu's creator. He acts as a brotherly figure to Young-gu, and gives him advice in dating Da-da. The damage of a previous model, Zero Seven, leads him to prevent Young-gu's delivery to Diana.

Supporting
 Gong Jung-hwan as Ko Ji-seok 
 Leader of the Kronos Heaven research lab in South Korea, who is known as the world's best mechanics expert. He is Bo-won and In-hyuk's superior.
 Kwon Hyun-sang as Hwang In-hyuk
 Bo-won's colleague at Kronos Heaven. He returns to the company to force the delivery of Zero Nine to Diana.
 Cha Jung-won as Bae Kyu-ri 
 A special effects makeup artist in Um Da-da's team as well as Da-da's best friend. 
 Kim Do-hoon as Yoo Jin
 A special effects makeup artist in Um Da-da's team. The youngest member of the team, he hits it off with Bo-won as they share the same interests.
 Ha Jae-sook as Yeo Woong 
 Ma Wang-joon's manager. She is the only one to know about Da-da and Wang-joon's secret relationship, and encourages Wang-joon to go public in his relationship with Da-da.
 Hong Seok-cheon as Geum Eun-dong
 Ma Wang-joon's agent at KIN Entertainment. He is later revealed to be the perpetrator of the break-up threats who wants Wang-joon and Da-da to be separated so as to safeguard his "investment".
 Choi Joo-won as Hwa-ni
 A rookie star under Geum's agency who despises Wang-joon for being one of South Korea's top actors.
 Go Jung-min as Park Ran
 The director of the company Diana inherited, who is the only one Diana can trust. She stays in Diana's mansion to look after her.
 Lee Seung-il as Ma Gwi-hoon

Special appearances
 Yoon Shi-yoon as himself (Ep. 2)
 The winner of the Best Male Lead at the awards ceremony in 2017. He presents the award to Wang-joon.
 Jung In-gi as Da-da's father (Ep. 5)
 Um Da-da's late father and founder of the Real special effects studio. He taught Da-da the make-up techniques from when she was young.
 Hong Ji-yoon as Ruby

Production
 The series was previously titled Romantic Comedy King, and was in talks to air on OCN but was ultimately cancelled.
 The lead roles of Um Da-da and Ma Wang-jun were previously offered to Song Ji-hyo and Chun Jung-myung respectively, but both declined. 
 The first script reading was held on June 22, 2018, and filming began in July. 
 Filming is complete and the series aired on SBS in May 2019. Originally scheduled to air for 40 episodes, the series was reduced by four episodes due to low ratings, as well as the suspension of the Monday-Tuesday drama timeslot that saw the following drama, Doctor Detective, move to the Wednesday-Thursday timeslot. The international broadcast remained at 40 episodes.

Original soundtrack

Part 1

Part 2

Part 3

Part 4

Part 5

Part 6

Part 7

Part 8

Ratings
In this table,  represent the lowest ratings and  represent the highest ratings.

Notes

References

External links
  
 
 

Korean-language television shows
2019 South Korean television series debuts
2019 South Korean television series endings
South Korean romantic comedy television series
South Korean science fiction television series
South Korean pre-produced television series
South Korean television dramas based on manga
Television series about robots
Television series by IHQ (company)
Absolute Boyfriend